The following is a list of awards and nominations received by Morgan Freeman. Freeman is considered one of the greatest actors of his generation and an acting icon. He is known for his distinctive deep voice, and his various roles on the stage and screen across of a variety film genres. 
For his lifetime achievement in acting he received the Kennedy Center Honors in 2008. His other honorary awards include the AFI Life Achievement Award in 2011, the Cecil B. DeMille Award in 2012 and the Screen Actors Guild Life Achievement Award in 2018.

Throughout his nearly seven-decade-long career he has earned a multitude awards and nominations for his performances. He has earned five Academy Award nominations winning Best Supporting Actor for his performance in Clint Eastwood's sports drama  Million Dollar Baby (2004). He was also nominated for his performances in Street Smart (1987), Driving Miss Daisy (1989), The Shawshank Redemption (1994), and Invictus (2009). He also has earned five Golden Globe Award nominations, winning Best Actor in a Musical or Comedy for Driving Miss Daisy.

Major awards

Academy Awards

Golden Globe Awards

Primetime Emmy Awards

Screen Actors Guild Awards

Tony Awards

Major awards

Black Reel Awards

MTV Movie Awards

NAACP Image Awards

Film critics awards

Miscellaneous awards

Lifetime achievement awards

Other honors
 1997: Received an honorary degree from Rhodes College, becoming an honorary alumnus
 1998: Received the Golden Plate Award of the American Academy of Achievement. His Golden Plate was presented by Awards Council member George Lucas.
 2008: Kennedy Center Honors
 2010: Received an honorary degree from Brown University
 2011: Inducted into the Living Legends of Aviation, receiving the Aviation Inspiration and Patriotism Award from the Kiddie Hawk Air Academy
 2013: Received an Honorary Degree (Doctor of Humane Letters) from Boston University
 2014: Freedom of the City from the City of London

References

Freeman, Morgan